Shut Up and Dance is the debut studio album by Canadian singer Victoria Duffield, released by Warner Music Canada on August 21, 2012. The title track was released as the lead single from the album in July 2011 and peaked at number 12 on the Canadian Hot 100 chart, and was certified platinum in Canada in February 2012. Three additional singles were released from Shut Up and Dance after the album's release: "Feel", "Break My Heart"—which peaked at number 35 on the Canadian Hot 100 and was later certified gold—and "They Don't Know About Us", a collaboration with Cody Simpson.

Track listing

Charts

References

External links
Victoria Duffield Official website
Shut Up and Dance on Discogs.
Shut Up and Dance on AllMusic.

2012 debut albums
Victoria Duffield albums
Warner Music Group albums